Jean-Louis Bretteville (15 June 1905 – 9 May 1956) was a Norwegian footballer. He played in nine matches for the Norway national football team from 1924 to 1936.

References

External links
 
 

1905 births
1956 deaths
Norwegian footballers
Norway international footballers
People from Arendal
Association football forwards
Lyn Fotball players
FSV Frankfurt players
Norwegian expatriate footballers
Expatriate footballers in Germany